Flaveria brownii, or Brown's yellowtops, is a North American plant species of Flaveria within the family Asteraceae. It is found only in the coastal regions of southern Texas in the United States. It grows primarily in sand dunes and salt marshes.

Stems sometimes grow straight up, sometimes reclining on the ground. One plant can sometimes produce 100 or more flower heads in a loose, branching array, each head with 5-10 yellow disc flowers. Sometimes the head also contains one single ray flower.

References

brownii
Endemic flora of Texas
Plants described in 1979
Flora without expected TNC conservation status